The Calamba–Los Baños Expressway is a proposed expressway in the Philippines that will start at South Luzon Expressway Extension (Calamba Exit) traverses along Laguna de Bay and ends up connecting a national road at Bay, Laguna. The construction of the four-lane  expressway will cost an estimated PHP5.9 billion or US$131.11 million. When constructed, it is expected to ease the traffic in the Calamba-Los Baños area, particularly along Calamba–Pagsanjan Road.

See also
Laguna Lakeshore Expressway Dike

References 

Proposed roads in the Philippines
Roads in Laguna (province)
Calamba, Laguna
Los Baños, Laguna